A by-election was held for the Australian House of Representatives seat of Adelaide on 6 February 1988. This was triggered by the resignation of Labor Party MP Chris Hurford to become Australia's Consul-General in New York City.

The election was won by Liberal candidate Mike Pratt with an 8.4 percent two-party swing on a 1.9 percent margin, defeating Labor candidate Don Farrell.

The 1988 Port Adelaide by-election occurred just seven weeks later.

Candidates

Independent – Bronwyn Mewett.
Independent – Peter Consandine, republican campaigner who later founded the Republican Party of Australia.
Independent – Michael Brander.
Independent – John Litten.
Australian Democrats – Ian McLeish.
Unite Australia Party – Dorothy McGregor-Dey, who contested Mayo for the party in 1987.
National Party of Australia – Bryan Stokes, the party's 1987 candidate.
Australian Labor Party – Don Farrell, assistant secretary of the Shop, Distributive and Allied Employees Association (SDA). Farrell was later influential in the South Australian Labor Party, and serves in the Senate (2016–present), having served previously from 2008 to 2014.
Liberal Party of Australia – Mike Pratt, a local farmer.

Results

See also
 List of Australian federal by-elections

References

Adelaide by-election
South Australian federal by-elections
Adelaide by-election, 1988
Adelaide by-election